Ali Sparkes (born 1966) is a British children's author.

Books

Her books include The Shapeshifter series of 6 books, Out of this World (a prequel to The Shapeshifter and first released as Miganium), Unleashed, a series of 5 books (a spin-off/sequel series of The Shapeshifter, centered on some of the other Shapeshifter characters), Dark Summer, Frozen in Time, Wishful Thinking, Destination Earth, the Monster Makers series, and the S.W.I.T.C.H series. 

Her debut book The Shapeshifter: Finding the Fox was nominated for the 2007 Bolton Children's Book Award. She has also won two Blue Peter Book Awards: "Book I Couldn't Put Down" and "Book Of The Year", for her book Frozen in Time.

Her 2015 novel Car-Jacked was a 2017 Red House Children's Book Award nominee.

Personal life

Sparkes is from Southampton and attended Bitterne Park School. She previously worked as a journalist for the Southern Daily Echo and for BBC Radio Solent.

References

External links

Living people
1966 births
 
English children's writers